This is the results breakdown of the local elections held in Galicia on 26 May 2019. The following tables show detailed results in the autonomous community's most populous municipalities, sorted alphabetically.

Opinion polls

City control
The following table lists party control in the most populous municipalities, including provincial capitals (shown in bold). Gains for a party are displayed with the cell's background shaded in that party's colour.

Municipalities

A Coruña
Population: 244,850

Ferrol
Population: 66,799

Lugo
Population: 98,025

Ourense
Population: 105,505

Pontevedra
Population: 82,802

Santiago de Compostela
Population: 96,405

Vigo
Population: 293,642

References

Galicia
2019